The 2004 Adidas International was a combine men's and women's tennis tournament played on outdoor hard courts at the NSW Tennis Centre in Sydney in Australia that was part of the International Series of the 2004 ATP Tour and of Tier II of the 2004 WTA Tour. The tournament ran from 11 through 18 January 2004. Lleyton Hewitt and Justine Henin-Hardenne won the singles titles.

Finals

Men's singles

 Lleyton Hewitt defeated  Carlos Moyá 4–3 (Moyá retired)
 It was Hewitt's 1st title of the year and the 22nd of his career.

Women's singles

 Justine Henin-Hardenne defeated  Amélie Mauresmo 6–4, 6–4
 It was Henin-Hardenne's 1st title of the year and the 17th of her career.

Men's doubles

 Jonas Björkman /  Todd Woodbridge defeated  Bob Bryan /  Mike Bryan 7–6(7–3), 7–5
 It was Björkman's 1st title of the year and the 39th of his career. It was Woodbridge's 1st title of the year and the 81st of his career.

Women's doubles

 Cara Black /  Rennae Stubbs defeated  Dinara Safina /  Meghann Shaughnessy 7–5, 3–6, 6–4
 It was Black's 1st title of the year and the 15th of her career. It was Stubbs' 1st title of the year and the 45th of her career.

External links
 Official website
 ATP tournament profile
 WTA tournament profile

 
Adidas International, 2004